Warszawa Służewiec railway station is a railway station in the Mokotów district of Warsaw, Poland. It is served by Koleje Mazowieckie, who run services from Warszawa Wschodnia to Góra Kalwaria and Skarżysko-Kamienna, and by PKP Intercity (TLK services).

References
Station article at kolej.one.pl

External links

Sluzewiec
Railway stations served by Koleje Mazowieckie
Mokotów